Crockett Independent School District is a public school district based in Crockett, Texas (USA).

In 2009, the school district was rated "academically acceptable" by the Texas Education Agency.

Schools
Crockett High School (Grades 9-12)
Crockett Junior High School (Grades 6-8)
Crockett Elementary School  (Grades 1-5)
Early Childhood Center (Grades PK-K)

References

External links
Crockett ISD

School districts in Houston County, Texas